Bahrain Post is the government organisation responsible for the post in Bahrain. Bahrain Post is part of the Bahrain Ministry of Transportation.

History

The postal system in Bahrain first started in 1884 with the establishment of the Manama Post Office. The postal system expanded drastically in the twentieth century; a second post office was later built on the island of Muharraq in 1946. A third post office was set up in the expatriate-populated town of Awali, run by the Bahrain Petroleum Company.

After declaring independence in 1971, Bahrain joined the International Postal Union in December 1973. Bahrain Post later joined the Arab Postal Union in May 1986.

See also 
Postage stamps and postal history of Bahrain

References

External links
Customs procedures at Muharraq Post Office. 
Official website

Postal organizations
Postal system of Bahrain